Omorgus chinensis is a species of hide beetle in the subfamily Omorginae and subgenus Afromorgus.

References

chinensis
Beetles described in 1858